Peritan Bozdağ (born 15 June 1999) is a Turkish-born Azerbaijani footballer who plays as a forward for Turkish Women's Football Super League club Fatih Vatan Spor and the Azerbaijan women's national team.

Club career 
Bozdağ has played for Konak Belediyespor and Hakkarigücü Spor in Turkey.

In the 2021-22 Turrkish Super League season, she transferred to Altay. In the 2022-23 Turkşish Super League season, she played for Fatih Vatan Spor.

International career 
Bozdağ made her senior debut for Azerbaijan on 11 June 2021 in a 2–3 friendly away loss to Georgia.

International goals

References

External links 

1999 births
Living people
Citizens of Azerbaijan through descent
Azerbaijani women's footballers
Women's association football forwards
Azerbaijan women's international footballers
Azerbaijani people of Turkish descent
People from Çeşme
Turkish women's footballers
Turkish Women's Football Super League players
Turkish people of Azerbaijani descent
Sportspeople of Azerbaijani descent
Konak Belediyespor players
Hakkarigücü Spor players
Altay S.K. (women's football) players
Fatih Vatan Spor players